İsmet İnönü Boulevard is a major avenue in Mersin, Turkey. It is named after İsmet İnönü (1884-1973), the second president of Turkish Republic between 1938 and 1950.

Geography

It runs parallel to the Mediterranean Sea coast line to south west for about  within the second-level municipality of Akdeniz. The Atatürk Park is between the boulevard and the sea. The governor's office, mayor's office, Mersin Grand Mosque Atatürk Manument and Mersin Halkevi are situated to the north of the boulevard.

It crosses Müftü River and continues within Yenişehir second-level municipality. The Tevfik Sırrı Gür Stadium is to the north of the boulevard and Mersin Lighthouse is to the south. At the junction with Adnan Menderes Boulevard, it turns to northwest and runs perpendicular to the sea coast. In this course, it intersects with Gazi Mustafa Kemal Boulevard by an interchange. The Nevin Yanıt Athletics Complex and the Macit Özcan Sports Complex are situated on the north portion of the boulevard.

History
Up to 1950s, the first  of the boulevard was actually the coast line. During the construction of the harbor the dredged material of the sea basin was spread out in front of the city to build the boulevard and Atatürk Park. Rest of the boulevard was constructed after the 1980s.

References

External links
Wowturkey for images

Streets in Mersin